, also known as  (English: "snuggly-wuggly"), is the main protagonist of the All Purpose Cultural Cat Girl Nuku Nuku OVA, TV series, and DASH OVA. In the DASH series, Atsuko is named Atsuko Higuchi, rather than Atsuko Natsume, but retains the Nuku Nuku nickname. In all three, her Japanese voice actress is Megumi Hayashibara and her English voice actress is Allison Keith.

In the OVA and TV series, Nuku Nuku is shown as a green-eyed, magenta-haired young girl of around fourteen to sixteen with a large bust, while in DASH, she is depicted as a nineteen-year-old girl, with green hair and golden eyes. In all three incarnations, Nuku Nuku will often have robotic cat ears pop out of her head.

Description
Atsuko Natsume is an alias that Nuku Nuku was given to pass as a real girl; she prefers to be called Nuku Nuku which is considered her true name. In truth, she is a biotech-type android of sorts with the brain (or nervous system as some sources claim) of a cat inserted inside. She was originally a cat until an incident (differs depending on each series) caused her brain to be transferred into the body of a war robot built by Mishima Industries. In the OVA and TV series, Nuku Nuku was created by Kyusaku Natsume, while in DASH, she was created by a friend of his. Regardless of which series, Nuku Nuku lives with Akiko, Kyusaku and their son, Ryuunosuke, who she considers her family.

In the OVA, Nuku Nuku acts as the protector for Ryunosuke while he's in the middle of a custody battle between Kyusaku and his wife, Akiko, the granddaughter of the weapons-producing Mishima Industries. They parted when they argued about the usage of his NK-1124 android (who would become Nuku Nuku), and Kyusaku took their son with him.

In the TV series, Nuku Nuku's role as protector changes, since Akiko and Kyusaku live together (albeit dysfunctionally and always arguing). Instead, she's protecting her family and her classmates from the machinations of Mishima Industries (whose president is different in this series).

In DASH, Nuku Nuku's role as protector degrades, only using her powers to stop berserk machines of Mishima, or occasionally their human agents, as she is programmed to protect all life. Like in the TV series, Akiko and Kyusaku also live together (still slightly dysfunctional) But, like Nuku Nuku, they have more mature natures as Akiko still works for Mishima Industries but in a lesser capacity and wears glasses. In this series, Ryunosuke is now 14 years old and has an immense crush on Nuku Nuku, who in this series is referred to by the name Atsuko Higuchi.

Abilities

Nuku Nuku possesses incredible physical abilities. Since her body was constructed as a military project, she is technically a combat cyborg. Her strength is nothing short of superhuman, easily capable of lifting hundreds of pounds with ease, throwing punches that can disable armored military vehicles, and leaping dozens of feet through the air. Her stamina is equally impressive, enabling her to utilize her amazing strength for long periods of time-one use for which she commonly uses this ability is to ride her bicycle on the highway, easily outrunning most automobiles. Her greatest asset (due to her peaceful nature) is her amazing resiliency, she has survived falls from aircraft and direct hits from heavy artillery. As her brain is that of a cat's, Nuku Nuku's reflexes, dexterity and balance are equally impressive.

Throughout the OVA and TV series, Nuku Nuku has survived being shot with a rocket, thrown through walls, dropped from hundreds of feet, and even an explosion that decimated a good deal of the city. In DASH she has a Transformation sequence which causes her abilities become active and is sometimes called 'Super Dynamite Girl', though this name is never actually used in the series, although Ryuunosuke refers to her as both a 'super sexy mystery woman' and as 'Miss Sexy Dynamite' in DASH when she is in this form and it is not until the very final episode of the series that he learns that Nuku Nuku and 'Super Dynamite Girl' are the same person. Nuku Nuku's tactical form is referred to as 'Maneki City's famous Hyper Woman' during episode nine, which features the battle between Sangoku Bross and Soldat in a battle between giant robots that quickly turns deadly as the latter robot apparently malfunctions and takes the commentator for the battle hostage to win its battle with Bross.

In DASH, Nuku Nuku's abilities are downgraded for a more cybergirl archetype. Early on her Powers are only active during her transformation into 'Super Dynamite Girl'. Her superhuman endurance is still present, but reduced in its effectiveness, as she has been seen cut and bleeding, indicating that in DASH, she actually has some approximation of organs aside from her brain, as something must send blood through her body. She can create claws of energy from her hands. She also disperses blasts of heat and energy. According to the official insert for the 2003 release of DASH on DVD, these powers are explained as a weapon called 'Blast Breakers'. This is what causes her to be able to shoot what the insert describes as 'high vibration, high heat' bursts of energy and can use these breakers to literally claw right through various materials. These breakers also allow her to lift a heavy tank or punch through a one-meter thick steel plate.

The insert for DASH also includes a full list of the other powers this version of Nuku Nuku has in addition to the Blast Breakers as well as a list of four forms for Nuku Nuku. Mode One is listed as her normal form, in which she ordinarily appears. Mode Two is her Tactical Form, which is identified as Super Dynamite Girl. Mode Three is referred to as Battle Form and is listed as being 'for more intense battle', but this form, and Mode Four, her so-called 'Final Form'— which is listed only as 'classified' by the insert — are never seen in the course of the series.

Because of her mechanical structure, Nuku Nuku can be linked with special devices to enhance her power in the OVAs and Nuku Nuku TV. She may also have been capable of doing so in DASH, but was not shown doing so, though she did work side by side with the large robot called Sangoku Bross in episode nine of the series.

Personality

In all three series, Nuku Nuku is displayed as happy, caring, naive, and protective of her loved ones. But, In DASH She has a little more maturity.   Nuku is very attached to her "father", Kyuusaku, even going so far as to refer to him as "Papa-san". She generally prefers not to fight and does not display any aggression to people who have wronged her. For example, in the OVA, Nuku Nuku does not hate Akiko at all, and even calls her "Mama-san,". In the same series, another android known as Eimi tried to steal Nuku Nuku's body (and later just focused on destroying her), but Nuku Nuku took her actions as just simple playing. Nuku Nuku is also an amazing homemaker in all three series, shown by how she's always cooking and cleaning for her family and with a smile on her face. Nuku Nuku always feels she has to protect someone when they're in danger, whether they're her friends and her family. She will only fight when this happens. Due to her personality and attractive figure, Nuku Nuku is always the main attraction of many young boys. Once when she worked at a restaurant, she was the sole reason their business tripled from all the young men coming in to see her.

The strongest and more complex of Nuku Nuku's relations would be with Ryuunoske. In the OVA, Ryuunoske was the one who discovered her as a cat (shortly before she was injured, leading her to becoming an android). She is most protective of him, as a devoted older sister, which usually spurs on her powers. In the OVA, it is likely this is due to the kindness he showed her by taking her in when she was a stray cat. Nuku Nuku always wants to be there for Ryuunoske, once suggesting she'd go to his school instead because she'd thought he'd be lonely without her. Nuku Nuku always tries to make Ryuunoske happy; for example, when she damaged his bike by accident, she went to work to buy him a new one. In DASH, her relationship with Ryuunoske is changed to that of a young man with a crush on the cute girl. Still, they share a deep closeness rivaling their sibling one in the OVA and TV series, and by the end of the series, Nuku Nuku has found herself reciprocating Ryuunosuke's romantic feelings, though this revelation comes just as she essentially commits suicide to stop her homicidal sister Rei Rei, making the moment bittersweet for the both of them.

One of Nuku Nuku's most played-on quirks is the fact she's still technically a cat in mind. Often, she will get excited when she sees a mouse and will chase after it, though this is only seen in the OVAs, TV series and manga, while in DASH! she does not portray those characteristics, instead she will often paw at her face with a fist as if grooming herself. This is typically seen after mealtimes or just after waking up from the previous night's sleep. Nuku Nuku is also a sucker for catnip in all forms of animation and the manga except for her appearance in DASH, in which she and Kyuusaku make every effort to conceal her nature and origins until the very end of the series.

Weakness
If anything, Nuku Nuku's greatest weakness is her naivety. She never assumes danger until it's too late, and then often sees it as play instead. Only when someone she cares about is in danger will she actually take it seriously.

Another weakness Nuku Nuku possesses, though light, is a drunk-like state when she smells catnip. She'll stagger around and lick anyone who's covered in it.

Nuku Nuku is also unable to swim unless she is given a special mechanical upgrade. In the OVA, she sunk like a rock, while in the TV series, she was simply unable to swim, until she sensed Kyusaku and Ryuunoske both in danger. In DASH her powers are mostly inactive until she is activated in TACTICAL FORM or detects life is in danger. In DASH, she also had a form of selective memory loss caused by her creator Professor Higuchi, which blocked off most of her knowledge of herself, her true nature, and how her powers worked. She also could not aid anyone who was artificially created at first, however she overcame this limitation when Sangoku Bross was endangered, and she was able to activate her tactical form by sheer force of will and the desire to protect the larger machine.

References

Catgirls
Fictional gynoids
Female characters in anime and manga
Comics characters introduced in 1990